Live in Tokyo is a live album by guitarist Jimmy Raney which was recorded in Japan in 1976 and released on the Xanadu label.

Reception

The Allmusic review awarded the album 4 stars stating "The boppish performances (which Raney considers among his very best) are subtle with lots of interplay between the players".

Track listing 
 "How About You?" (Burton Lane, Ralph Freed) - 5:22  
 "Darn That Dream" (Jimmy Van Heusen, Eddie DeLange) - 4:53  
 "Anthropology" (Charlie Parker, Dizzy Gillespie) - 3:58  
 "Watch What Happens" (Michel Legrand) - 3:36  
 "Autumn Leaves" (Joseph Kosma, Jacques Prévert, Johnny Mercer) - 4:05  
 "Stella by Starlight" (Victor Young, Ned Washington) - 3:35  
 "Here's That Rainy Day" (Van Heusen, Burke) - 4:53  
 "Cherokee" (Ray Noble) - 4:49

Bonus tracks on 1988 reissue The Complete Jimmy Raney in Tokyo (EPM Musique – FDC 5157, Xanadu Records – FDC 5157)

 "Just Friends" (John Klenner and Sam M. Lewis) - 4:23
 "Groovin' High" (Dizzy Gillespie) - 7:46
 "Blue 'n' Boogie (Dizzy Gillespie and Frank Paparelli) - 7:32

Personnel 
Jimmy Raney - guitar
Sam Jones - bass
Leroy Williams - drums

References 

Jimmy Raney live albums
1976 live albums
Xanadu Records live albums
Albums produced by Don Schlitten